Inez Palange (June 13, 1889 – October 16, 1962), also written as Ines Palange, was an Italian-born American actress who was best known for her role as Mrs. Camonte in the 1932 film Scarface.

Biography
She was born in Roccasicura, Italy on June 13, 1889. Prior to her film career she was part of Les Iris Palange, a comedy and singing duo with Alberto Palange. At least two of their recordings on Victor records from 1917 are part of the Library of Congress catalogue (and posted to YouTube). They performed in Italian. A bit about her experience as an immigrant along with others is noted in a book on Italian immigrants.

Palange performed in the first Italian language dialogue film, Sei tu l'amore?, released in 1930.

Palange played the mother of a gangster in Scarface (1932). Her dialogue with the character of her American-born daughter in which she warns against her son's character has been described as portraying two conflicting character traits, her Old World wisdom in seeing through her son's facade but expressed in halting, non-standard English, underlining her status in the New World as an unassimilated and uneducated immigrant, signifying her inability to relate her insights to her daughter.

Palange had a variety of supporting, minor, and bit roles in various Hollywood films. She died October 16, 1962 in Los Angeles, California.

Selected filmography 

 Sei tu l'amore? (1930) - The modiste
 Always Goodbye (1931) - Italian Maid (uncredited)
 Frankenstein (1931) - Villager (uncredited)
 Scarface (1932) - Mrs. Camonte, Tony's Mother
 Speak Easily (1932) - Rosa - Tony's Wife (uncredited)
 Tiger Shark (1932) - Mike's Neighbor (uncredited)
 Men of America (1932) - Mrs. Garboni (uncredited)
 Grand Slam (1933) - Woman at Wedding Party (uncredited)
 The White Sister (1933) - Italian Mother (uncredited)
 The Mind Reader (1933) - Cleaning Lady (uncredited)
 Heroes for Sale (1933) - Mrs. Bonicelli (uncredited)
 Pilgrimage (1933) - Mrs. Carlucci (uncredited)
 Mary Stevens, M.D. (1933) - Tony's Wife (uncredited)
 Night Flight (1933) - Simone's Maid (uncredited)
 Fugitive Lovers (1934) - Maria (uncredited)
 Bedside (1934) - Italian Mother (uncredited)
 I've Got Your Number (1934) - Italian Lady (uncredited)
 Merry Wives of Reno (1934) - Italian Woman (uncredited
 All Men Are Enemies (1934) - Proprietress (uncredited)
 The Age of Innocence (1934) - Natasia (uncredited)
 Society Doctor (1935) - Mrs. Esposito (uncredited)
 Enchanted April (1935) - Castle Servant (uncredited)
 After Office Hours (1935) - Diner Owner's Wife (uncredited)
 Black Fury (1935) - Mrs. Morova (uncredited)
 Dinky (1935) - Junkman's Wife (uncredited)
 Break of Hearts (1935) - Violin Student's Mother (uncredited)
 The Flame Within (1935) - Bar and Flophouse Manager (uncredited)
 Case of the Missing Man (1935) - Italian Mother
 The Melody Lingers On (1935) - Louisa
 A Night at the Opera (1935) - Maid (uncredited)
 It Had to Happen (1936) - Italian Mother (uncredited)
 Robin Hood of El Dorado (1936) - Nurse with Madre (uncredited)
 Women Are Trouble (1936) - Italian Mother (uncredited)
 His Brother's Wife (1936) - Native Mother (uncredited)
 Dodsworth (1936) - Teresa - Edith's Housekeeper (uncredited)
 Libeled Lady (1936) - Fortune Teller (uncredited)
 A Woman Rebels (1936) - Signora Grassi (uncredited)
 Once a Doctor (1937) - Mrs. Rossi (uncredited)
 Man of the People (1937) - Italian Woman (uncredited)
 Sea Devils (1937) - Mrs. Palange - Italian Woman (uncredited)
 Song of the City (1937)- Mrs. 'Mama' Romandi
 You Can't Have Everything (1937) - Mrs. Romano (uncredited)
 The Firefly (1937) - Flower Woman (uncredited)
 Portia on Trial (1937) - Mrs. Gannow
 Ebb Tide (1937) - Native Woman (uncredited)
 Wise Girl (1937) - Italian Hat Customer (uncredited)
 Change of Heart (1938) - Italian Cook (uncredited)
 Little Miss Roughneck (1938) - Mercedes Orozco
 The Black Doll (1938) - Rosita, the housekeeper
 The Baroness and the Butler (1938) - Gypsy Fortune-Teller (uncredited)
 Penrod and His Twin Brother (1938) - Foreign Woman (uncredited)
 King of the Newsboys (1938) - Neighbor (uncredited)
 Yellow Jack (1938) - Dr. Finlay's Housekeeper (uncredited)
 Speed to Burn (1938) - Mama Gambini
 Marie Antoinette (1938) - Fish Wife (uncredited)
 Flirting with Fate (1938) - Señora Lopez
 Road Demon (1938) - Mama Gambini
 Winner Take All (1939)- Mama Gambini
 The Lady and the Mob (1939) - Mrs. Angela Zambrogio (uncredited)
 Only Angels Have Wings (1939) - Lily's Aunt (uncredited)
 Chicken Wagon Family (1939) - Mrs. Buzzi
 The Grapes of Wrath (1940) - Woman in Camp (uncredited)
 Viva Cisco Kid (1940) - Maria (uncredited)
 One Million B.C. (1940) - Tohana
 I Was an Adventuress (1940) - Fisherman's Wife
 On Their Own (1940) - Mrs. Galentoni (uncredited)
 Behind the News (1940) - Almedo's Landlady (uncredited)
 Romance of the Rio Grande (1941)- Mama Lopez
 Caught in the Act (1941) - Mary Ripportella
 Flight from Destiny (1941) - Mrs. Moraciagos (uncredited)
 Under Fiesta Stars (1941) - Mrs. Romero
 Beyond the Blue Horizon (1942) - Native Nurse (uncredited)
 The Gay Sisters (1942) - Italian Woman Going to Court (uncredited)
 Life Begins at Eight-Thirty (1942) - Mrs. Spano (uncredited)
 Out of This World (1945) - Mrs. Palukas (uncredited)
 A Bell for Adano (1945) - Italian Woman (uncredited)
 Murder in the Music Hall (1946) - Mrs. Aldine (uncredited)
 The Homestretch (1947) - Gypsy Woman (uncredited)
 Unconquered (1947) - Squaw (uncredited)
 The Loves of Carmen (1948) - Woman in Crowd (uncredited)
 The Snake Pit (1948) - Italian Patient (uncredited)
 Captain Carey, U.S.A. (1950) - Villager (uncredited)
 September Affair (1950) - Concierge (uncredited)
 The Miracle of Our Lady of Fatima (1952) - Townswoman (uncredited)
 Cry of the Hunted (1953) - Old Woman (uncredited)
 Monster from the Ocean Floor (1954) - Tula
 Hot Blood (1956) - Gypsy (uncredited)
 The Ten Commandments (1956) - Slave (uncredited)

References

External links 
 
 Inez Palange at Library of Congress's National Jukebox

Italian emigrants to the United States
American film actresses
1889 births
1962 deaths
20th-century American actresses